The 1985 World's Strongest Man was the ninth edition of World's Strongest Man and was won by Geoff Capes from the United Kingdom. It was his second title after finishing third the previous year. 1984 champion Jón Páll Sigmarsson from Iceland finished second and Cees de Vreugd from the Netherlands finished third. The contest was held at Cascais, Portugal.

Final results

References

External links
 Official site

World's Strongest
World's Strongest Man
1985 in Portugal